A tensilon test, also called an edrophonium test, is a pharmacological test used for the diagnosis of certain neural diseases, especially myasthenia gravis. It is also used to distinguish a myasthenic crisis from a cholinergic crisis in individuals undergoing treatment for myasthenia gravis.

Procedure
A 10 mg edrophonium chloride syringe and a 2 mg atropine syringe are prepared. Atropine is prepared for immediate use in case cholinergic crisis occurs. After a neurologic examination and recording of vital signs, 2 mg edrophonium is injected intravenously. After waiting 30 seconds and ensuring that no adverse reactions have occurred, the remaining 8 mg of edrophonium is also injected. The patient is then asked to perform repetitive tasks, (i.e. lifting an object or repeatedly opening and closing their eyelids). Under the influence of edrophonium, patients with myasthenia gravis are able to complete these tasks more easily and with more strength than before the injection was administered. The effects of edrophonium last around 10 minutes. The edrophonium allows accumulation of acetylcholine (ACh) in the neuromuscular junctions, and makes more ACh available to the muscle receptors, thereby increasing muscle strength in myasthenia gravis.
In newborns, a 0.15 mg/kg Neostigmine administered subcutaneously produces a response within 10 minutes. In infants, the drug is administered intravenously at a dose of 0.2 mg/kg. Improvement of diplopia is often used as an evaluation item because in this case, placebo effect can be excluded.

Precautions
The tensilon test is administered by a trained clinician, usually a neurologist. A thorough history taking and physical assessment is done before the administration of test, to rule out hypersensitivity, pregnancy, lactation and intestinal obstruction. Care is taken while performing the test in individuals over 50, and those under corticosteroids or pro-cholinergic drugs. Vital signs are monitored before, during and after the test. The test should only be performed in a medical center equipped to manage cholinergic crisis. Following the test, the patient is observed for cholinergic responses such as increased salivation, lacrimation, nausea and vomiting.

References

Diagnostic neurology
Diagnostic ophthalmology